The Bethlehem Association is a non-profit charitable organization based in Pennsylvania with the stated goal of bringing together people from North America and the rest of the world who have family origins in and around the Palestinian city of Bethlehem, including the adjoining villages of Beit Jala and Beit Sahur, in the West Bank.

The organization was established in 1985 by Palestinian-American doctor Edward A. Hazboun and others as a means of preserving and promoting the cultural heritage of the Bethlehem region. The organization organizes social activities for its members, and is also involved in fund-raising for charities and scholarships in Bethlehem. In 2007, the organization held in annual convention in Bethlehem.

References
 The Bethlehem Association
 "Bethlehem: Eyewitness Account," The Muslim Observer, 18 October 2007

International cultural organizations
Bethlehem
Non-profit organizations based in Pennsylvania
501(c)(3) organizations